Jayammu Nischayammu Raa may refer to:
 Jayammu Nischayammu Raa (1989 film), a Tollywood film directed by Jandhyala starring Rajendra Prasad, Sumalatha and Chandra Mohan
 Jayammu Nischayammu Raa (2016 film), a Tollywood film directed and produced by Shiva Raj Kanumuri starring Srinivasa Reddy and Poorna